Carnival is a 1921 British silent drama film directed by Harley Knoles and starring Matheson Lang, Ivor Novello and Hilda Bayley. During a production of William Shakespeare's Othello in Venice, an Italian actor suspects his wife of having an affair and plans to murder her on stage. It was based on a stage play of the year before, of which Matheson Lang was one of the writers. The film was a popular success, and was re-released the following year. In 1931, it was remade as a sound film, Carnival, directed by Herbert Wilcox.

Cast
 Matheson Lang as Sylvio Steno
 Ivor Novello as Count Andrea
 Hilda Bayley as Simonetta, Silvio's wife (credited as Hilda Bailey)
 Clifford Grey as Lelio, Simonetta's brother
 Victor McLaglen as Baron
 Florence Hunter as Nino, Silvio's son
 Maria de Bernaldo as Ottavia, Silvio's sister

References

Bibliography
 Low, Rachel. The History of British Film: Volume IV, 1918–1929. Routledge, 1997.

External links

Carnival at BFI Sreenonline

1921 films
1921 drama films
1920s English-language films
Films directed by Harley Knoles
Films set in Venice
British drama films
British black-and-white films
Films about actors
Films about theatre
Films based on Othello
British silent feature films
1920s British films
Silent drama films